Kotwa, India, a city in Uttar Pradesh, India

Kotwa may also refer to:

Kotwa (village), village in Allahabad, Uttar Pradesh, India
Kotwa, Zimbabwe, a town in Mudzi District, Mashonaland East Province, Zimbabwe

See also
Katwa (disambiguation)